Seongdong market is the largest traditional market in Gyeongju, North Gyeongsang province, South Korea. Located on the opposite side of Gyeongju station with an entrance on Wonhwa-ro (street), it provides crops, vegetables, fruits, and seafood produced in Gyeongju and nearby areas. There are also vendors that sell street food such as kimbap, sundae, and tteokbokki. An indoor area composed of ten or so restaurants offer fresh banchan as a buffet-style meal or à la carte. Seongdong Market was established in 1971. The market opens in the early morning.

See also
 List of markets in South Korea
 List of South Korean tourist attractions

References

External links

 Official tourism information website for Seongdong market

Retail markets in Gyeongju
Food markets in South Korea